Nancy González may refer to:
 Nancy González (model), Miss Venezuela 1965
 Nancy González (politician), Argentine politician